Palaistra can refer to:

palaestra, an ancient Greek wrestling school
Palaistra, Florina, a village in the Florina regional unit, Greece